Blue economy is a term in economics relating to the exploitation, preservation and regeneration of the marine environment. Its scope of interpretation varies among organizations. However, the term is generally used in the scope of international development when describing a sustainable development approach to coastal resources. This can include a wide range of economic sectors, from the more conventional fisheries, aquaculture, maritime transport, coastal, marine and maritime tourism, or other traditional uses, to more emergent activities such as coastal renewable energy, marine ecosystem services (i.e. blue carbon), seabed mining, and bioprospecting.

Definitions
According to the World Bank, the blue economy is the "sustainable use of ocean resources for economic growth, improved livelihoods, and jobs while preserving the health of ocean ecosystem."

European Commission defines it as "All economic activities related to oceans, seas and coasts. It covers a wide range of interlinked established and emerging sectors."

The Commonwealth of Nations considers it "an emerging concept which encourages better stewardship of our ocean or 'blue' resources."

Conservation International adds that "blue economy also includes economic benefits that may not be marketed, such as carbon storage, coastal protection, cultural values and biodiversity."

The Center for the Blue Economy says "it is now a widely used term around the world with three related but distinct meanings- the overall contribution of the oceans to economies, the need to address the environmental and ecological sustainability of the oceans, and the ocean economy as a growth opportunity for both developed and developing countries."

A United Nations representative recently defined the Blue Economy as an economy that "comprises a range of economic sectors and related policies that together determine whether the use of ocean resources is sustainable. An important challenge of the blue economy is to understand and better manage the many aspects of oceanic sustainability, ranging from sustainable fisheries to ecosystem health to preventing pollution. Secondly, the blue economy challenges us to realize that the sustainable management of ocean resources will require collaboration across borders and sectors through a variety of partnerships, and on a scale that has not been previously achieved. This is a tall order, particularly for Small Island Developing States (SIDS) and Least Developed Countries (LDCs) who face significant limitations." The UN notes that the Blue Economy will aid in achieving the UN Sustainable Development Goals, of which one goal, 14, is "life below water".

World Wildlife Fund begins its report Principles for a Sustainable BLUE ECONOMY with two senses given to this term: "For some, blue economy means the use of the sea and its resources for sustainable economic development. For others, it simply refers to any economic activity in the maritime sector, whether sustainable or not."

As the WWF reveals in its purpose of the report, there is still no widely accepted definition of the term blue economy despite increasing high-level adoption of it as a concept and as a goal of policy-making and investment.

Related terms

Ocean economy 
A related term of blue economy is ocean economy and we see some organizations using the two terms interchangeably. However, these two terms represent different concepts. Ocean economy simply deals with the use of ocean resources and is strictly aimed at empowering the economic system of ocean. Blue economy goes beyond viewing the ocean economy solely as a mechanism for economic growth. It focuses on the sustainability of ocean for economic growth. Therefore, blue economy encompasses ecological aspects of the ocean along with economic aspects.

Green economy 
The green economy is defined as an economy that aims at reducing environmental risks, and that aims for sustainable development without degrading the environment. It is closely related with ecological economics. Therefore, blue economy is a part of green economy.  During Rio+20 Summit in June 2012, Pacific small island developing states stated that, for them, "a green economy was in fact a blue economy".

Blue growth 
A related term is blue growth, which means "support to the growth of the maritime sector in a sustainable way." The term is adopted by the European Union as an integrated maritime policy to achieve the goals of the Europe 2020 strategy.

Blue justice

Potential
On top of the traditional ocean activities such as fisheries, tourism and maritime transport, blue economy entails emerging industries including renewable energy, aquaculture, seabed extractive activities and marine biotechnology and bioprospecting. Blue economy also attempts to embrace ocean ecosystem services that are not captured by the market but provide significant contribution to economic and human activity. They include carbon sequestration, coastal protection, waste disposal, and the existence of biodiversity.

The 2015 WWF briefing puts the value of key ocean assets over US$24 trillion. Fisheries are now overexploited, but there is still plenty of room for aquaculture and offshore wind power. Aquaculture is the fastest growing food sector with the supply of 58 percent of fish to global markets. Aquaculture is vital to food security of the poorest countries especially. Only in the European Union the blue economy employed 3,362,510 people in 2014.

Issues 
The World Bank specifies three challenges that limit the potential to develop a blue economy.

 Current economic trends that have been rapidly degrading ocean resources.
 The lack of investment in human capital for employment and development in innovative blue economy sectors.
 Inadequate care for marine resources and ecosystem services of the oceans.

Sectors 
 Aquaculture (fish farms, but also algaculture)
 Maritime biotechnology
 Bioprospecting
 Fishing
 Desalination 
 Maritime transport
Coastal, marine and maritime tourism (Blue Tourism)
 Mineral resources
 Offshore oil and gas
 Offshore wind power (also tidal and wave)
 Shipbuilding and Ship repair
Carbon sequestration
Coastal protection
Waste disposal
Existence of biodiversity
 Ocean development

See also
 The Blue Economy (book) which uses the term differently, namely for "solutions for environmental problems that are based upon simpler and cleaner technologies".
 Directorate general for Maritime affairs, Fisheries and Aquaculture - French government agency regulating the Blue Economy.

References

Blue carbon
Schools of economic thought
Industrial ecology
Natural resources
Resource economics